Usharal Airport  is a domestic aerodrome serving Usharal, the capital of the Alakol District, in the south-eastern Almaty Region of Kazakhstan.

Airlines and destinations

References

Airports built in the Soviet Union
Airports in Kazakhstan